Deocampo is a surname. Notable people with the surname include:

Daniel Deocampo, American geologist, geochemist, and academic administrator
Nick Deocampo (born 1959), Filipino filmmaker and film historian